Diana Miller may refer to:

Diana Miller,  American actress in silent films
Diana Miller, Countess of Mértola, eldest daughter of Sackville Pelham
Diana Miller, American murder victim